"A Wound Time Can't Erase" is a song written by B. Johnson, performed by Stonewall Jackson, and released on the Columbia label (catalog no. 4–42229). It debuted on the Billboard country and western chart in January 1962, peaked at the No. 3 spot, and remained on the chart for a total of 22 weeks. It was also ranked No. 6 on Billboards 1962 year-end country and western chart.

See also
 Billboard Top Country & Western Records of 1962

References

Stonewall Jackson (musician) songs
1962 songs